Neil Powney Thompson (born 10 October 1938) is a Sri Lankan-born English former first-class cricketer.

Thompson was born at Colombo in October 1938. He later studied in England at Worcester College at the University of Oxford. While studying at Oxford, he played first-class cricket for Oxford University in 1961, making seven appearances, which included playing in that years University Match against Cambridge at Lord's. A left-arm fast-medium bowler, Thompson took 17 wickets in his seven matches an average of 37.47, with best figures of 4 for 72.

References

External links

1938 births
Living people
People from Colombo
English people of Sri Lankan descent
Alumni of Worcester College, Oxford
English cricketers
Oxford University cricketers
Sri Lankan people of English descent
People from British Ceylon